Mark Allen Mothersbaugh (born May 18, 1950) is an American musician, singer, songwriter, and composer. He came to prominence in the late 1970s as co-founder, lead singer and keyboardist of the new wave band Devo, whose "Whip It" was a top 20 single in the US in 1980, peaking at No. 14, and which has since maintained a cult following. Mothersbaugh is one of the main composers of Devo's music.

In addition to his work with Devo, Mothersbaugh has made music for television series, films and video games via his production company, Mutato Muzika. He composed the music for the 13-year run of the animated series Rugrats and its three related theatrical films. As a solo musician, Mothersbaugh has released four studio albums: Muzik for Insomniaks, Muzik for the Gallery, Joyeux Mutato and The Most Powerful Healing Muzik in the Entire World.

In 2004, he received the Richard Kirk award at the BMI Film and TV Awards for his contributions to film and television music. In 2008, Mothersbaugh received an honorary doctorate of humane letters from Kent State University, his alma mater.

His lifelong interest in creating multimedia art pieces has resulted in gallery exhibitions of items such as his "Beautiful Mutants" photograph series, postcard diaries, art rugs, sculptures and musical instruments created from salvaged organ pipes and bird vocalizations. He has married twice and is the father of two adopted children.

Early years
Mark Allen Mothersbaugh was born on May 18, 1950, in Akron, Ohio. His parents are Mary Margaret ("Mig") and Robert Mothersbaugh, Sr. He grew up with two younger brothers, Bob and Jim, who are both musicians, and two sisters, Amy and Susan, and graduated from Woodridge High School in Peninsula, Ohio.
His father appeared in early Devo films and fan events as the character General Boy and his brothers participated in the band, although Jim's tenure was brief, appearing only on several early demos.

Career

Devo

Mothersbaugh attended Kent State University as an art student, where he met Devo co-founders Gerald Casale and Bob Lewis. In early 1970, Lewis and Casale formed the idea of the "devolution" of the human race after Casale's friends Jeffrey Miller and Allison Krause were killed by Ohio National Guardsmen on university grounds during what came to be known as the Kent State shootings. Intrigued by the concept, Mothersbaugh joined them, building upon it with elements of early post-structuralist ideas and oddball arcana, most notably unearthing the infamous Jocko-Homo Heavenbound pamphlet (the basis for the song "Jocko Homo"). This association culminated in 1973, when the trio started to play music as Devo.
Following the commercial failure of their sixth studio album Shout, Warner Bros. dropped Devo. Shortly after, claiming to feel creatively unfulfilled, drummer Alan Myers left the band, causing the remaining band members to abandon the plans for a Shout video LP, as well as a tour.

In 1987, Devo reformed with new drummer David Kendrick, formerly of Sparks, to replace Myers. Their first project was a soundtrack for the flop horror film Slaughterhouse Rock, starring Toni Basil and they released the albums Total Devo (1988) and Smooth Noodle Maps (1990), on Enigma.

Devo had a falling-out and played two shows in 1991 before breaking up. Around this time, members of Devo appeared in the film The Spirit of '76, except for Bob Mothersbaugh. In 1989, Mark Mothersbaugh established Mutato Muzika, a commercial music production studio, hiring Ryan Moore and Bob Casale; Bob Mothersbaugh was also involved.

In 2006, Devo worked with Disney on the Devo 2.0 project: a band of child performers was assembled to re-record Devo songs. The Akron Beacon Journal wrote, "Devo recently finished a new project in cahoots with Disney called Devo 2.0, which features the band playing old songs and two new ones with vocals provided by children. Their debut album, a two disc CD/DVD combo entitled DEV2.0, was released on March 14, 2006. The lyrics of some of the songs were changed for family-friendly airplay, which has been claimed by the band to be a play on irony of the messages of their classic hits. Mothersbaugh doesn't rule out the idea of the band gathering in the studio, eventually, to record a new Devo album." The album, Something for Everybody was eventually released in June 2010, preceded by a 12" single of "Fresh"/"What We Do".

Devo was awarded the first Moog Innovator Award on October 29, 2010, during Moogfest 2010 in Asheville, North Carolina. The award aims to celebrate "pioneering artists whose genre-defying work exemplifies the bold, innovative spirit of Bob Moog". Devo was scheduled to perform at Moogfest, but canceled three days beforehand after Mark's brother Bob Mothersbaugh (lead guitar) injured his hand. He and Gerald Casale collaborated with Austin, Texas, band The Octopus Project to perform "Girl U Want" and "Beautiful World" at the event instead.

Other work
In 1989, Mothersbaugh and other members of Devo were involved in the project Visiting Kids, releasing a self-titled EP on the New Rose label in 1990. The group featured his then-wife Nancye Ferguson, as well as David Kendrick, Bob Mothersbaugh, and Bob's daughter Alex Mothersbaugh. Mothersbaugh co-wrote some of the songs, and produced the album with Bob Casale. A promotional video was filmed for the song "Trilobites". Visiting Kids appeared on the soundtrack to the film Rockula, as well as on the Late Show with David Letterman.

Since Devo, Mothersbaugh has developed a successful career writing musical scores for film and television. In film, he has worked frequently with filmmaker Wes Anderson, scoring four of his feature films (Bottle Rocket, Rushmore, The Royal Tenenbaums, and The Life Aquatic with Steve Zissou). He composed for The Lego Movie and Thor Ragnarok.

His music has been a staple of the children's television shows Rugrats, Beakman's World, Santo Bugito and Clifford the Big Red Dog. He wrote the new theme song for the original Felix the Cat show when it was sold to Broadway Video, some music for Pee-wee's Playhouse in 1986-1990 and the theme song for the Super Mario World TV series for DIC Entertainment in 1991. The character design for Chuckie Finster on Rugrats was based on him. Along with Bob Casale, he produced Heroes & Villains (2000), a soundtrack album with music inspired by The Powerpuff Girls. Mothersbaugh originally intended to be the show's main composer, but his demo was rejected by creator Craig McCracken, who despite being a Devo fan, had concerns about his cartoon being pushed aside if a big feature film came to Mothersbaugh's production company.

Mothersbaugh produces music for video games, including Sony's Crash Bandicoot and Jak and Daxter series (both music scores were created by Josh Mancell), and for EA Games' The Sims 2. This work is often performed with Mutato Muzika, the music production company he formed with several other former members of Devo including his brother, Bob Mothersbaugh. Mothersbaugh composed the original score for Ratchet & Clank: Rift Apart.

Mothersbaugh composed:

 "Having Trouble Sneezing", the distinctive music in the award-winning "Get a Mac" commercials for Apple Inc.
 The score for the first season of the television series Big Love, though he was replaced after one season by David Byrne of Talking Heads.
 The theme music for the American television show Eureka, broadcast on the Syfy channel.
 The score of the Cartoon Network's TV series Regular Show.

In 2013, Mothersbaugh appeared on an episode of The Aquabats! Super Show!, an action-comedy series by the creators of Yo Gabba Gabba! starring the Devo-influenced band The Aquabats, playing the eccentric scientist father of one of the main characters, Jimmy the Robot.

Mothersbaugh and Casale have produced music for other artists, including Toni Basil.

Visual art
Mothersbaugh has also been successful as a visual artist. In November 2014, Mothersbaugh said, "I've done over 150 art gallery shows in the last 20 years."

On February 6, 2014, the Museum of Contemporary Art Denver (MCA Denver) announced a retrospective exhibition to bring together the first comprehensive presentation of Mothersbaugh's art and music. This nationally touring exhibition was accompanied by a publication, Mark Mothersbaugh: Myopia, published by Princeton Architectural Press. 50 selections of postcard art from Myopia were published as a postcard book titled Mark Mothersbaugh: Collected Facts & Lies in 2015. 

Mothersbaugh hosted a drawing segment on the Nick Jr. television series Yo Gabba Gabba! called Mark's Magic Pictures, teaching children how to draw simple pictures. The pictures often come alive at the end of the segment through animation.

Personal life
At the age of seven, Mothersbaugh began wearing glasses to correct his severe myopia and astigmatism, before which he was legally blind. Over the years, he took an interest in designing his own distinctive eyewear for use in Devo shows. He favored a set of stainless steel frames for regular use made by a Los Angeles shop called LA Eyeworks and says he purchased as many pairs as he could find because they tended to break or get stolen by fans. In a joint venture with eyewear manufacturer Shane Baum, Mothersbaugh has designed his own branded frames for sale, made of beryllium with a stainless steel chrome finish, in three different styles as of 2015. The Baumvision press release states that the unisex model "Francesca" is named for one of Mothersbaugh's pug dogs which is a simultaneous hermaphrodite that is also called Frank.

He has been married twice. His first wife was actress Nancye Ferguson, who can be seen briefly performing with him in the 1999 superhero comedy film Mystery Men. His current wife is Anita Greenspan, who runs the film music managing company Greenspan Kohan Management with Neil Kohan. The couple has two daughters from China, adopted after Greenspan learned of the practice in that country of female children being abandoned because of their gender.

Mothersbaugh is a collector and connoisseur of song poems and unusual or vintage musical devices. He is the owner of Raymond Scott's Electronium (although it is currently not functional).

Mothersbaugh contracted COVID‑19 in May 2020, and was placed on a ventilator in an intensive care unit at Cedars-Sinai Medical Center for 18 days. In August 2020, Mothersbaugh recounted that he "nearly died" of the disease, and was in a delusional state while infected; he came to believe that he had been hospitalized after being hit by a brick in Little Tokyo, and repeatedly urged his family members to search for his attackers. He described having lasting neuropathic pain as a result of the illness.

Mothersbaugh was once a member of the Church of the SubGenius.

Honors and awards
Mothersbaugh was honored with the Richard Kirk award at the 2004 BMI Film and TV Awards. The award is given annually to a composer of film and television music.

On May 10, 2008, Mothersbaugh was awarded an honorary doctorate of humane letters from Kent State University.

On May 28, 2016, Mothersbaugh was awarded the key to the city of Akron during a ceremony at the Akron-Summit County Public Library.

Filmography

 Human Highway (1982)
 NBC (1990) (station ID's)
 Felix the Cat (1990) (TV, digitally remastered footage version of the original series) (theme)
 Super Mario World (1991) (TV) (theme)
 Liquid Television (1991) (TV)
 Davis Rules (1991) (TV)
 Sewer Shark (1992) (VG)
 Great Scott! (1992) (TV)
 Frosty Returns (1992) (TV)
 Mann & Machine (1992) (TV)
 Beakman's World (1992) (TV) (theme)
 Brain Donors (1992) (opening and end credits)
 Bakersfield P.D. (1993) (TV)
 South Beach (1993) (TV)
 Street Match (1993) (TV)
 Down on the Waterfront (1993)
 Hotel Malibu (1994) TV Series
 Edith Ann: A Few Pieces of the Puzzle (1994) (TV)
 Santo Bugito (1995) (TV) (as Mark "Mothersbug")
 Too Something (1995) (TV)
 If Not for You (1995) (TV)
 Strange Luck (1995) (TV)
 Sliders (1995) (TV)
 The Courtyard (1995) (TV)
 The Last Supper (1995) (musical score)
 Flesh Suitcase (1995)
 The Big Squeeze (1996)
 Class Reunion (1996) (TV)
 Quicksilver Highway (1997) (TV)
 Fired Up (1997) (TV)
 Men (1997)
 Unwed Father (1997) (TV)
 Working (1997) (TV) (theme)
 Last Rites (1998) (TV)
 The Mr. Potato Head Show (1998) (TV)
 The Simple Life (TV)
 Stories from My Childhood (1998) (TV)
 Interstate '82 (1999) (VG)
 Rocket Power (1999) (TV) (theme music)
 The Wacky Adventures of Ronald McDonald: The Visitors from Outer Space (1999) (V)
 Sammy (2000) (TV)
 Tucker (2000) (TV)
 The Other Me (2000) (TV)
 All Growed Up (2001) (TV)
 Rugrats: Still Babies After All These Years (2001) (TV)
 Second String (2002) (TV)
 Cheats (2002)
 MDs (2002) (TV)
 Hidden Hills (2002) (TV)
 The Groovenians! (2002) (TV)
 A Guy Thing (2003)
 The Life Aquatic with Steve Zissou (2004)
 The Big House (2004) (TV)
 Popeye's Voyage: The Quest for Pappy (2004) (V)
 The Sims 2 (and Expansion Packs) (2004–2008) (VG)
 The Complete Truth About De-Evolution (2004) (V)
 Music for Edward Gorey (2005)
 Get a Mac (2006–2009)
 Feed Me (2006)
 Eureka (2006) (TV) (Theme)
 Boom Blox (2008) (VG)
 Cars Toons (2008–2014)
 Boom Blox Bash Party (2009) (VG)
 Skate 3 (2010) (VG)
 Catfish (2010)
 Hawaiian Vacation (2011)
 Shameless (2011) (TV)
 Thor: Ragnarok (2017)
 Hotel Transylvania 3: Summer Vacation (2018)
 The Mitchells vs. the Machines (2021)
 Hotel Transylvania: Transformania (2022)
 How We Roll (2022)

Television

Film

1980s

1990s

2000s

2010s

2020s

Video games

Bibliography
 My Struggle (as Booji Boy)
 What I Know Volume I
 Beautiful Mutants

Discography

With Devo

Solo
Studio albums
 Muzik for Insomniaks (Cassette, 1985)
 Later released on CD as Muzik for Insomniaks, Vol. 1 and Muzik for Insomniaks, Vol. 2 in 1988 by Rykodisc
 Muzik for the Gallery (LP, 1987)
 Joyeux Mutato (CD, 1999, Rhino Handmade limited edition; reissued 2000 by Rhino to regular retail)
 The Most Powerful Healing Muzik in the Entire World (6-CD Set, 2005)
 Mutant Flora (6 × Vinyl, 7" Box Set, 2017)

References

External links

Official art and exhibitions website

1950 births
Living people
20th-century American musicians
20th-century American singers
21st-century American composers
21st-century American singers
American male songwriters
American male pop singers
American male singers
American multi-instrumentalists
American people of English descent
American people of Swiss descent
American punk rock singers
American film score composers
Animated film score composers
American television composers
American new wave musicians
American SubGenii
American synth-pop musicians
American rock songwriters
American tenors
Devo members
Kent State University alumni
American male film score composers
Male new wave singers
Male television composers
Musicians from Akron, Ohio
Record producers from Ohio
Singer-songwriters from Ohio
Sony Pictures Animation people
Synth-pop singers
Video game composers
Video game musicians
21st-century American artists
Hollywood Records artists
Rykodisc artists
Enigma Records artists
American post-punk musicians